In enzymology, a N-acetyllactosaminide beta-1,6-N-acetylglucosaminyl-transferase is an enzyme that catalyzes the chemical reaction

UDP-N-acetyl-D-glucosamine + beta-D-galactosyl-1,4-N-acetyl-D-glucosaminyl-R  UDP + N-acetyl-beta-D-glucosaminyl-1,6-beta-D-galactosyl-1,4-N-acetyl-D- glucosaminyl-R

Thus, the two substrates of this enzyme are UDP-N-acetyl-D-glucosamine and beta-D-galactosyl-1,4-N-acetyl-D-glucosaminyl-R, whereas its 3 products are UDP, N-acetyl-beta-D-glucosaminyl-1,6-beta-D-galactosyl-1,4-N-acetyl-D-, and glucosaminyl-R.

This enzyme belongs to the family of glycosyltransferases, specifically the hexosyltransferases.  The systematic name of this enzyme class is UDP-N-acetyl-D-glucosamine:beta-D-galactosyl-1,4-N-acetyl-D-glucosaminide beta-1,6-N-acetyl-D-glucosaminyltransferase. Other names in common use include N-acetylglucosaminyltransferase, uridine diphosphoacetylglucosamine-acetyllactosaminide, beta1->6-acetylglucosaminyltransferase, Galbeta1->4GlcNAc-R beta1->6 N-acetylglucosaminyltransferase, and UDP-GlcNAc:Gal-R, beta-D-6-N-acetylglucosaminyltransferase.  This enzyme participates in glycosphingolipid biosynthesis - neo-lactoseries and glycan structures - biosynthesis 2.

References

 

EC 2.4.1
Enzymes of unknown structure